The Three Lives of Thomasina is a 1963 fantasy film directed by Don Chaffey, starring Patrick McGoohan, Susan Hampshire, child actor Matthew Garber and child actress Karen Dotrice in a story about a cat and her influence on a family.  The screenplay was written by Robert Westerby and Paul Gallico. It was based upon Gallico's 1957 novel Thomasina, the Cat Who Thought She Was God. The film was shot in Inveraray, Argyll, Scotland, and Pinewood Studios, England.

Plot
In Inveranoch, Scotland, in the year 1912, veterinarian Andrew MacDhui lives with his seven-year-old daughter Mary and her cat Thomasina, who narrates the film in voiceover. Dr. MacDhui is a widower whose wife's death destroyed his belief in God and his empathy for others. When Thomasina contracts tetanus, Dr. MacDhui orders his assistant Willie Bannock to euthanize her. Willie reminds Dr. MacDhui that he promised Mary to make Thomasina well again. Traumatised by Thomasina's death, Mary withdraws emotionally from Dr. MacDhui and declares her father dead, refusing to speak to or look at him.

Thomasina's soul goes to a feline afterlife and meets the Egyptian cat goddess Bastet. Since Thomasina still has eight lives left, Bastet returns her to her body.

Mary and her friends take Thomasina's body out beyond the town for a funeral, but are frightened by the appearance of "Mad Lori" MacGregor, a young woman who lives in the glen and was attracted by the children's singing and bagpipe playing. The children believe she is a witch because of her apparent power to calm and cure animals. Lori brings Thomasina back to her makeshift animal hospital, but although the cat recovers, she has no memory of her first life with Mary. Thus begins her second life.

The townspeople, put off by Dr. MacDhui's lack of compassion, begin to take their sick pets to Mad Lori instead. Dr. MacDhui visits Lori with the intention of confronting her for stealing his business, but instead they both realize that they each have half of what is needed to treat sick animals. He has the science and surgical knowledge; she has the love and compassion.

Thomasina's memory is slowly returning. She realizes she misses something very important, but she doesn't know what. She remembers the way back home, but doesn't recognize Mary, who chases her into a rainstorm. Thomasina returns to the safety of Lori's cabin in the woods, but Mary contracts pneumonia after Dr. MacDhui finds her lying on the street in the rain.

A tribe of gypsies sets up camp in town and opens their travelling circus. When Dr. MacDhui and Mad Lori discover the gypsies have been abusing their performing animals, they visit the circus. Their attempt at discussion leads to a fight and eventually, a fire. The police arrest the proprietors for animal cruelty.

Dr. MacDhui prays for the first time in four years that God will somehow cure his daughter.  Off in the glen, a lightning bolt strikes a tree next to Thomasina and her memory is suddenly restored. Thomasina returns to the MacDhui home and Dr. MacDhui places her in Mary's arms, thereby restoring Mary's will to live, as well as her love for her father. Lori's love has changed Dr. MacDhui and they are soon married, making the perfect veterinary team. Thomasina begins her third life with all of them together.

Cast
Patrick McGoohan –  Dr. Andrew MacDhui
Susan Hampshire –  Lori MacGregor
Karen Dotrice –  Mary MacDhui
Laurence Naismith –  Reverend Angus Peddie
Jean Anderson –  Mrs. MacKenzie
Wilfrid Brambell –  Willie Bannock
Finlay Currie –  Grandpa Stirling
Ruth Dunning –  Mother Stirling
Vincent Winter –  Hughie Stirling
Denis Gilmore –  Jamie McNab
Ewan Roberts –  Constable McQuarrie
Oliver Johnston –  Mr. Dobbie
Francis de Wolff –  Targu
Charles Carson –  Doctor
Nora Nicholson –  Old Lady
Jack Stewart –  Birnie
Matthew Garber –  Geordie McNab
Thomasina –  Herself—the Cat
Elspeth March –  the voice of Thomasina

Reception
In a pre-release review, Howard Thompson of The New York Times (2 June 1964) found the film "a nice one, but...far from top-drawer Disney."  He thought it was a "sentimental and extremely genteel little movie...best suited for small girls," but praised the major performers (including the cat) and the settings. He concluded by describing the film as "mighty, mighty cosy." Film critic Leonard Maltin (in his book The Disney Films) on the other hand, refers to this film very highly; calling it "delicate and charming", and very deserving of a larger audience if ever reissued. One scene in particular that he highly praised, was Thomasina's trip to Cat Heaven, calling it: "a wondrous piece of movie magic". In another article written by Maltin, he includes this film title among the lesser known gems of Disney Movies, (along with other film titles like Darby O'Gill and the Little People). Maltin also said Dotrice "won over everyone" with her performance in Thomasina, and she (and fellow cast member Matthew Garber) were signed to play the Banks children in the Disney film Mary Poppins.

References in other works
In Grant Morrison's comic book series The Invisibles,  Mason Lang claims that the film "explains 'Everything'". He is later given a statue of the goddess Bast by Lady Edith Manning.

See also
List of American films of 1963

References

External links 
  
 
 
 

1963 films
American children's fantasy films
British children's fantasy films
1960s children's fantasy films
Walt Disney Pictures films
1960s English-language films
Films about cats
Films based on American novels
Films based on fantasy novels
Films directed by Don Chaffey
Films produced by Walt Disney
Films set in 1912
Films set in Scotland
Films shot in England
Films shot in Argyll and Bute
Films about reincarnation
Films based on works by Paul Gallico
Films shot at Pinewood Studios
Films scored by Paul Smith (film and television composer)
1960s American films
1960s British films
Bastet